Farinha Master (1957–2002, real name Carlos Cordeiro) was a Portuguese experimental musician and performer. Most notably was the mentor of Ocaso Épico in 1981, a project that incorporated synthpop, electronica, industrial music, minimalism and Portuguese folk music in a hallucinated, sarcastic style. Their lyrics are often absurd showing a reminiscence of Dadaism. Although they won an important music contest and were appreciated by the public and the musical press their discography is scarce and belated. Farinha Master formed and fronted other projects such as Angra do Budismo, Zao Ten and Gamma Ray Blast. Interested in oriental philosophy and music (himself a Yoga practicer) his compositions also reflect this.

Discography
Muito Obrigado (LP, Dansa do Som, 1988)
Desperdícios (Demo Tape, Tragic Figures, 1989)

Compilations
Ao Vivo No Rock Rendez-Vous (1984) - Intro
Insurrectos (1990)  - Uma Bica e um Neubauten
Feedback (1990) - Entre Barreiras / D. Suzete
Corrosão Cerebral (1992) - M. Obx

References

External links

Ocaso Épico Myspace playlist

Portuguese musicians
Portuguese male musicians
2002 deaths
1957 births
20th-century male musicians